Sociedad Deportiva Atlético Nacional is a Panamanian football team who currently play in the Panamanian second division.

It is based in Panama City, and is the team of the National Police of Panamá.

History

Atlético Nacional

In 1995, a team named Atlético Nacional was founded and played a couple of years in the ANAPROF league until they were disbanded in 2001 due to manipulation and alteration of documents. Nicknamed Los Linces (The Bobcats), Atlético Nacional had always been one of Panama's historic teams to play in ANAPROF, and even though they had never won a championship they managed to become a surprise team in the league on more than one occasion. In 1996–97 the club played a modest season after just coming 1 point short of reaching the hexagonal round of ANAPROF, it finished 8th of 12 teams. In the next season there were changes in the league format, instead of having a general table, the 1997–98 season was divided in two groups, Atletico Nacional managed to improve its performance by finishing 3rd in its group. However they lost the quarter-final match against Plaza Amador 2–1 on aggregate. The following season Atletico Nacional managed to achieve the same success they had accomplished the previous season, finishing 2nd in their group, but were eliminated in the hexagonal round (yet another ANAPROF change in its format) when finishing 5th. The same results would occur in the 1999–2000 season, after finishing 6th in the general table and classifying to the hexagonal round, the team was eliminated when it finished last. The 2000–01 season was its last season where the team reached the hexagonal round, after finishing 5th in the general table, but the same results as the previous season repeated themselves and the team finished 6th.

Final season
2001 was the last season of Atletico Nacional, after the league was reformatted and divided into Apertura and Clausura championships, the team never managed to get into the hexagonal round. The apertura was the worst of its history; the team finished 9th of 10 teams. In the clausura they managed to improv,e but still came one point short of reaching the hexagonal round. Atletico Nacional's last game in ANAPROF was against Alianza F.C. where they were defeated 2–1. Rolando Escobar scored the last goal for the team.

Disbandment
In October 2001 Atlético Nacional were ejected from the league because of violating ANAPROF rules. They had been using Colombian player Luis Palacios on a Panamanian registration, because only 5 foreigners were allowed by ANAPROF. Their expulsion saved Chiriquí from the drop.

Club Deportivo Policía Nacional
The club were reformed in 2005 as Club Deportivo Policía Nacional in Liga Nacional de Ascenso (second division), and in 2005 the team managed promotion to the top level after beating Atalanta 1–0. They were relegated to the Second Division in 2006.

Sociedad Deportiva Atlético Nacional
They were renamed Sociedad Deportiva Atlético Nacional in 2008. In December 2012, Atlético Nacional lost the Apertura final to Millenium UP but they clinched promotion to the LPF in June 2015 after they won the Panamanian Second Division championship decider against SUNTRACS. They had already beaten SUNTRACS in November 2014 in the Apertura final.

Honours
Liga Nacional de Ascenso: 2
 2005, 2015

Players

Current squad
 ''As of Apertura 2015

Notable players
 Georgi Aguilar
 Alberto Blanco (2011–2013)
 Rolando Escobar (2000–2003)
 Juan Palacios

Historical list of coaches

 José Alfredo Poyatos (2012–2013)
 José Chiari (2013–2014)
 Eric Ortega (2015 – Jun 2015)
 Daniel Valencia (June 2015–)

References

External links
 RSSSF

Football clubs in Panama
Panama City
1995 establishments in Panama
Association football clubs established in 1995
Police association football clubs